John Cowe McIntosh  (1892 – 28 March 1921) was a British-born Australian aviator.

McIntosh was born in Scotland and later emigrated to Western Australia. On the outbreak of World War I in 1914, he enlisted in the Australian Army Medical Corps, serving with the 4th Field Ambulance in Gallipoli and reaching the rank of corporal. In 1918, he transferred to the Australian Flying Corps and began flying training near Oxford in England. He was commissioned a second lieutenant in April 1919 and shortly afterwards was promoted lieutenant.

After the end of the war, the Australian government offered a prize of £10,000 for the first flight from England to Australia. He paired with another Australian Flying Corps officer, Ray Parer, and, although leaving well after the event had been won, they arrived in Darwin on 2 August 1920. Their aircraft was an Airco DH-9, and theirs was the only other entrant to successfully complete the race. He and Parer were awarded the Air Force Cross for this feat on 23 November 1920, as well as £500 each.

In 1921, McIntosh was killed in an air crash near Pithara, Western Australia. It was the first fatal air crash in the state.

Footnotes

Bibliography

1892 births
1921 deaths
Scottish emigrants to Australia
Australian military personnel of World War I
Australian Army officers
Australian Army soldiers
Australian aviators
Recipients of the Air Force Cross (United Kingdom)
Aviators killed in aviation accidents or incidents in Australia
Accidental deaths in Western Australia
Victims of aviation accidents or incidents in 1921